The term English council could refer to: 

 English Liberal Democrats 
 Local government in England